The LSWR 700 class  was a class of 30 0-6-0 steam locomotives designed for freight work. The class was designed by Dugald Drummond in 1897 for the London and South Western Railway in England and built by Dübs and Company at that company's Queen's Park works at Polmadie, Glasgow, Scotland.

Overview
The class was originally numbered 687–716 but the year after delivery numbers 702–716 were given new numbers vacated by engines that had been withdrawn. The locomotives gained the nickname 'Black Motor' early in their career. They were well designed and had few major modifications during the existence of the fleet – the exception being fitted with superheaters from 1919 to 1929, which required the fitting of an extended smokebox. They shared many standard parts with Drummond's other designs (including sharing boilers with the M7 class).

Construction and numbering

Nos. 702–716 were renumbered by the LSWR between June and August 1898, becoming 306, 308, 309, 315, 317, 325–327, 339, 346, 350, 352, 355, 368, 459 respectively. In June 1912, no. 459 was renumbered again, to 316.

Soon after the locomotives passed to Southern Railway (SR) ownership, their LSWR numbers were prefixed "E" to denote Eastleigh Works - this was done to distinguish similarly-numbered locomotives from the other constituents of the SR; thus, LSWR No. 687 became SR No. E687. These prefixes were dropped from mid-1931. In the meantime, there had been a proposal (prepared in March 1927) to renumber some classes into continuous blocks: the 700 class were allocated the series E336–9, E369–379 and E686–701 but none were actually renumbered, and the plan was cancelled in December 1927.

Ownership changes

The 700s remained intact as a class through SR ownership from 1923 to 1947. The locomotives passed to British Railways (BR) in 1948, who increased the former LSWR/SR numbers by 30000.

Accidents and incidents

Withdrawal
The first to be withdrawn was No. 30688 in September 1957, with the second, No. 30352, following in June 1959 and then the third, No. 30687, in September 1960. Withdrawals then started en masse in 1961, and was completed in December 1962. No examples of the class have been preserved.

Models
Hornby produce models of the 700 class in both Southern Railway livery and British Railway livery including an example of the engine in the Return from Dunkirk train pack. A model of the class was originally produced by OO Works.

Notes

References

External links

 Southern e-group

700
0-6-0 locomotives
Dübs locomotives
Railway locomotives introduced in 1897
Scrapped locomotives
Standard gauge steam locomotives of Great Britain